Nalinikanth is an Indian actor known for his works predominantly in Tamil and Telugu, Malayalam films. He debuted in the 1980 film Kadhal Kadhal Kadhal and has appeared in over 100 films. Nalinikanth was once a popular villainy actor. He resembles Rajinikanth. His notable movies such as Mundhanai Mudichu, Raasukkutti, Mangamma Sapatham, Rudhra, Puthupatti Ponnuthaye, Enga Muthalali, Raja Enga Raja, Yaamirukka Bayamey.

Film career 
Nalinikanth was introduced in Telugu cinema by director Dasari Narayana Rao. His debut movie was Rangoon Rowdy released in 1979. He has acted as hero such as azhaithal varuven, idhayam pesugirathu. He did 35 films in Telugu as well. He was given some notable roles in the films of Bhagyaraj. he did villain role in Sivaji's Satyam film. It ran for 100 days. From NTR to Nageswara Rao, Sobhan Babu, Balakrishna, Chiranjeevi he acted as Villain.

Television career 
As his acting career in the films did not give a helping hand to come up high, he changed his path in producing serials. He produced many Tamil and Telugu serials for Sun TV, Vijay TV, Gemini TV and Maa TV.

  Mandhira Punnagai
 Kaatrukkenna Veli (Star Vijay), as Varadharajan (Vennila's father)
Marmadesam (Rahasyam), as Annamalai

Filmography 
This is a partial filmography. You can expand it.

1970s

1980s

1990s

2000s

2010s

2020s

References

External links 
 

Living people
Year of birth missing (living people)
Male actors in Tamil cinema
Male actors in Telugu cinema